was a Japanese video game developer. The company name was apparently an acronym for Computer Amusement Visualizer, although the company web site also claims it refers to caviar.

The company was founded on March 1, 2000, and had its headquarters in Tokyo, Japan. Its shareholders included Amuse Capital, Tokuma Shoten, Tohokushinsha Film Corporation, Nippon Television Network Corporation, Tokyo FM Broadcasting, Mitsubishi Corporation, and Hayao Nakayama.

Cavia is best known for the Drakengard series, the first title in the Nier series and two Resident Evil rail shooters: The Umbrella Chronicles and The Darkside Chronicles.

In October 2005, the company's name was sold to AQ Interactive. AQ Interactive became a holding company responsible for the management of subsidiary companies as well as sales and promotion of game software. The old company's game planning & development business was transferred to a newly established Cavia Inc.

In July 2010, the company was officially disbanded and absorbed into AQ Interactive. Cavia would henceforth stop developing games, with Nier which it released in May 2010 being the last game developed by Cavia. Despite the closure, some members of the development staff from Nier, including director Yoko Taro, went on to produce a sequel to the Drakengard series, Drakengard 3, under Access Games and published by Square Enix.

Former members of the development teams at Cavia, Inc. have either gone freelance, or joined other development teams within Marvelous AQL (as a part of their merger), Comcept, Tango Gameworks, FromSoftware or rejoined the teams at Namco where members of Cavia, Inc. were from originally.

Games

References

External links 
Official website via Internet Archive

Software companies based in Tokyo
Japanese companies established in 2000
Video game companies established in 2000
Video game companies disestablished in 2010
Defunct video game companies of Japan
Video game development companies
Japanese companies disestablished in 2010
AQ Interactive